Umbrellawort is a common name for several flowering plants and may refer to:

 Mirabilis, a genus of plants in the family Nyctaginaceae
 Tauschia, a genus of flowering plants in the carrot family